LeSports is a company that Le.com owned 10.34% stake.

LeSports became title sponsor of the Beijing Wukesong Culture & Sports Center in 2016.

References

Sports television in China
Mass media companies of China